The Dutch Eerste Divisie in the 1978–79 season was contested by 19 teams. Excelsior won the championship.

New entrants
Relegated from the 1977–78 Eredivisie
 FC Amsterdam
 Telstar

League standings

Promotion competition
In the promotion competition, four period winners (the best teams during each of the four quarters of the regular competition) played for promotion to the Eredivisie.

See also
 1978–79 Eredivisie
 1978–79 KNVB Cup

References
Netherlands - List of final tables (RSSSF)

Eerste Divisie seasons
2
Neth